Okan Chatziterzoglou (born 5 March 1996) is a Greek professional footballer who plays as a centre-back for Romanian club  Metaloglobus București.

Career
In his career Chatziterzoglou also played for teams such as Xanthi and Panserraikos.

References

External links
 
 

1996 births
Living people
Footballers from Xanthi
Greek people of Turkish descent
Greek footballers
Greece youth international footballers
Greece under-21 international footballers
Association football defenders
Super League Greece players
Xanthi F.C. players
Football League (Greece) players
Panserraikos F.C. players
Apollon Larissa F.C. players
O.F. Ierapetra F.C. players
Liga I players
LPS HD Clinceni players
Liga II players
FC Politehnica Iași (2010) players
FC Metaloglobus București players
Greek expatriate footballers
Greek expatriate sportspeople in Romania
Expatriate footballers in Romania